Amsterdam is a 2022 period mystery comedy thriller film directed, written, and co-produced by David O. Russell and starring Christian Bale (who also co-produced), Margot Robbie, and John David Washington alongside an ensemble supporting cast including Chris Rock, Anya Taylor-Joy, Zoe Saldaña, Mike Myers, Michael Shannon, Timothy Olyphant, Andrea Riseborough, Taylor Swift, Matthias Schoenaerts, Alessandro Nivola, Rami Malek, and Robert De Niro. The story is based on the Business Plot, a 1933 political conspiracy in the US, and follows three friends—a doctor, a nurse, and a lawyer—who reunite and seek to uncover the act following the mysterious murder of a retired US general. Filmed in Los Angeles from January to March 2021, it is Russell's first film since Joy (2015).

Amsterdam was released in the United States on October 7, 2022, by 20th Century Studios. The film received mixed reviews from critics, who criticized Russell's screenplay and direction for its over-ambition and tonal inconsistency, but praised the production design and cast performances. It was also a box office bomb, with estimated losses for the studio reaching $97 million.

Plot
In 1918, Burt Berendsen is sent by his estranged wife's parents to fight in World War I. While stationed in France, Burt befriends African-American soldier Harold Woodman. After sustaining injuries in battle, Burt and Harold are nursed back to health by Valerie Bandenberg, an eccentric nurse who makes art out of shrapnel removed from the soldiers, whom they befriend as well.

After the end of the war, the three live together in Amsterdam and become close friends until Burt returns to New York City to be with his wife. Harold, who has fallen in love with Valerie and begun a tenuous romantic relationship with her, also departs to New York to fulfill his aspirations of becoming a lawyer.

Fifteen years later, Burt has opened his own medical practice catering to veterans of the war, and still remains friends with Harold, who is now a lawyer. However, they have not heard from Valerie since they left Amsterdam. Harold asks Burt to perform an autopsy on Bill Meekins (a senator who served as the commander of their regiment during the war) at the behest of Meekins' daughter Elizabeth, who believes that he was murdered. Burt performs the autopsy with the help of medical examiner Irma St. Clair. The autopsy reveals a considerable amount of poison in Meekins' stomach; Burt and Irma theorize that this must have been his cause of death. Burt and Harold meet with Elizabeth to talk about the autopsy results, though she is suddenly killed when a hitman pushes her into traffic. The hitman frames Burt and Harold for her death, and they flee as the police arrive.

Burt and Harold attempt to find out who had led Elizabeth to hire them in order to clear their names. This leads them to wealthy textile heir Tom Voze, his patronizing wife Libby, and Valerie (whose real surname was Voze), Tom's sister. They learn that Valerie was the one who convinced Elizabeth to hire them, knowing that they were trustworthy. Valerie is under constant supervision by Tom and Libby, who claim that she suffers from a nerve disease. Burt and Harold talk with Tom, who suggests they talk to General Gil Dillenbeck, a famous and decorated veteran who was friends with Meekins.

While Burt attempts to contact the General, Harold and Valerie spend the day at her home, where they notice the hitman, Tarim Milfax. They follow him to a forced sterilization clinic owned by a mysterious organization known as the "Committee of the Five." After a fight with Milfax, Harold and Valerie reunite with Burt. Valerie takes them to the Waldorf Astoria New York, where they meet Paul Canterbury and Henry Norcross, Valerie's benefactors from Amsterdam who are secretly spies in the intelligence community. Paul and Henry explain that the Committee of the Five plan to overthrow the American government and that Dillenbeck can help them foil their plot.

The trio meet up with General Dillenbeck, who is offered a large sum of money from a man on behalf of an unnamed benefactor to deliver a speech advocating for veterans to forcibly remove President Franklin D. Roosevelt and install Dillenbeck as a puppet dictator instead. The General agrees and plans to speak at a reunion gala Burt and Harold are hosting in order to draw out whoever is behind the plot. 

At the gala, General Dillenbeck reads his own speech instead of the one he was paid to read. Milfax intends to shoot him for doing so, but Harold and Valerie manage to stop him in time. Milfax is arrested and the Committee of the Five are revealed to be four industry leaders, including Tom, who are fanatically obsessed with Benito Mussolini and Adolf Hitler and intended to make America a fascist country.

Tom and the other leaders are arrested by the police, but they do not stay inside long and slander General Dillenbeck in the press following their release. General Dillenbeck testifies about the incident to Congress and returns home to live out his life. Harold and Valerie leave the country since they cannot be together in the United States. Burt wishes them farewell, planning to reopen his medical practice and pursue a relationship with Irma.

Cast

Additionally, Christopher Gehrman appears as McGuire, based upon Gerald C. MacGuire, who represents the Committee of the Five in their negotiations with Dillenbeck.

Production
In January 2020, New Regency announced the development on an untitled film written and directed by David O. Russell and starring Christian Bale, with filming expected to begin that April. In February, Margot Robbie and Michael B. Jordan were announced to star, but the latter dropped out before production began due to scheduling conflicts. Jennifer Lawrence was reportedly considered for Robbie's role, while Jamie Foxx was considered for Jordan's. In October, John David Washington was cast as Jordan's replacement. The rest of the ensemble cast was revealed between January and June 2021. Much of the cast worked for scale, and Bale took less than his typical $5 million fee while Malek earned a six-figure salary.

Filming was originally set to begin in March 2021 in Boston on a $50 million budget, but was delayed because of the COVID-19 pandemic. Filming was moved to Los Angeles, California after the cast did not want to travel to Boston amid the pandemic. Principal photography took place over 49 days between January and March 2021. The move from Boston to Los Angeles and COVID-precautions caused the film's final budget to balloon to $80 million. Crew members included cinematographer Emmanuel Lubezki (his first feature film since 2015), editor Jay Cassidy, and score composer Hildur Guðnadóttir. In April 2022, at CinemaCon, the film's title was revealed to be Amsterdam. In August, it was revealed that Guðnadóttir had exited as composer, with Daniel Pemberton now replacing her. According to Robbie, on the last day of filming, they kept production going after their filming permit ended, so the police had to call "wrap" on the film.

Historical basis
The conspiracy underlying the plot of the film is loosely based on the Business Plot, an alleged conspiracy to oust President Franklin D. Roosevelt in 1933. De Niro's character, Gil Dillenbeck, is based on General Smedley Butler, who testified before the McCormack–Dickstein committee in 1934 regarding the alleged conspiracy. Most other details of the conspiracy depicted in the film, including the Committee of Five, its connections to Nazism, and the names of most of the individuals involved, are fictionalized. The rally that occurs at the end of the film may have been inspired by the 2017 documentary film A Night at the Garden, which depicts a 1939 Nazi rally at Madison Square Garden.

Although the main trio of characters in Amsterdam are fictional, the film accurately depicts aspects of the 369th Infantry Regiment, which fought in France in World War I and consisted of African Americans serving under mostly white officers. The film also has the 1932 Bonus March as a major background event, and Dillenbeck's speech at the event is based on a similar speech delivered by Butler.

Release

Marketing 
The film was previewed at the 2022 CinemaCon on April 27, 2022. The trailer was released on July 6, 2022, set to Ten Years After's 1971 song "I'd Love to Change the World." An edited version of the trailer was shown in theaters, revealing the film's release date as October 7. Character posters were released on September 12, 2022. Disney and Regency spent an estimated $70 million on global promotion.

Theatrical
Amsterdam premiered at Alice Tully Hall in New York City on September 18, 2022, and was released in the United States on October 7, 2022, by 20th Century Studios. It was originally scheduled for November 4, 2022 release, but was moved up to October 7 to avoid the release of Black Panther: Wakanda Forever, another film being released by Walt Disney Studios Motion Pictures. It was also screened in IMAX; a special screening, preceded by a Live Q&A broadcast, took place in IMAX theaters nationwide on September 27, 2022.

Home media
The film was released for VOD on November 11, 2022, with a Blu-ray, DVD and 4K UHD release set for December 6, 2022.

Reception

Box office 
Amsterdam grossed $14.9 million in the United States and Canada, and $16.3 million in other territories, for a worldwide total of $31.2 million, against a production budget of $80 million. Following its opening weekend, Deadline Hollywood estimated the film would lose New Regency an estimated $97million, accounting for production budgets, marketing, talent participations, and other costs versus box office grosses and home media revenues.

In the United States and Canada, Amsterdam was released alongside Lyle, Lyle, Crocodile, and was initially projected to gross around $10 million from 3,005 theaters in its opening weekend, with some estimates reaching $15 million. After making $2.6 million on its first day, including $550,000 from Thursday night previews, expectations were lowered to $7 million. The film went on to debut to $6.5 million, finishing in third. Deadline Hollywood blamed the poor performance on the critical response, 134-minute runtime deterring audiences, and Disney being unsure how to market the film due to its quirky style and convoluted plot. The film made $2.2 million in its second weekend, dropping 55% and finishing in fifth.

Critical response
On the review aggregator website Rotten Tomatoes, 32% of 250 critics gave the film a positive review, with an average rating of 5.1/10. The site's critics consensus reads: "Amsterdam has a bunch of big stars and a very busy plot, all of which amounts to painfully less than the sum of its dazzling parts." Metacritic assigned the film a weighted average score of 48 out of 100 based on 52 critics, indicating "mixed or average reviews". Audiences polled by CinemaScore gave the film an average grade of "B" on an A+ to F scale, while those at PostTrak gave the film a 72% overall positive score.

In positive reviews, Pete Hammond of Deadline Hollywood lauded the "complex" screenplay, "uniquely conceived" characters, cinematography, costume, production, and score. Giving the film four out of five stars, James Mottram of South China Morning Post described Amsterdam as "a Hal Ashby-style caper full of fireworks with contemporary political overtones". Scott Mendelson of Forbes described it as an "all-star delight" with "strong production values" and a "terrific ensemble cast delivering some top-shelf work." Chris Knight, writing for National Post, admired the film's "rattling" pace, "lovely" screenplay and supporting cast. Brian Truitt of USA Today, Ryan Swen of Slate, and Oliver Jones of The New York Observer gave the film three out of four stars. Calling it a thoroughly entertaining, "whimsical whodunit" and "quirky, big-hearted trip", Truitt's praise was focused on the cast, especially the "crowd-pleasing" chemistry between Bale, Robbie and Washington. Swen complimented the film's sentiment and "detail-rich" narrative. Jones wrote, the film is "quite odd and discombobulating, but if you allow its turned up and persistent energy to sweep over you, and soak in the joy and righteous anger that animates its generous spirit, the end result is decidedly moving, and—at some points—even enthralling." Richard Brady wrote in his New Yorker blog of the film's "nuanced performances" of "slightly heightened caricatures" that enact a "deliciously intricate" and "exuberant" account of the 1933 "business plot" against FDR.

Several critics found Amsterdam overambitious and tonally inconsistent. Peter Bradshaw of The Guardian rated the film three out of five stars and complimented its humor, but felt the story was "exhaustingly wacky". /Films Jeff Ewing stated that Amsterdam "has a number of charming scenes, a stunningly top-tier cast, and flawless cinematography", but cited "wildly fluctuating tones" and "plot contrivances" as its shortcomings. Rating it a B–, The A.V. Clubs Jordan Hoffman found the cast to be "energetic, entertaining, and enjoyable", but called the film "an overly ambitious political potboiler". David Rooney of The Hollywood Reporter wrote that Amsterdam is "a lot of movies inelegantly squidged into one—a zany screwball comedy, a crime thriller, an earnest salute to pacts of love and friendship, an antifascist history lesson with fictional flourishes." He praised the lead performances, cinematography, production and costume design, but felt its material suits a limited series more than a film. Pastes Aurora Amidon praised the "vibrant, no-frills cinematography", "whip-tight" editing and the cast's "incredible" performances, despite the "bewildering" story. Reviewing for Screen International, Tim Grierson called the film an "overstuffed murder mystery" with a "convoluted" story, but cheered some aspects—the plot's "unpredictability" and the "indulgent cheekiness" of the film. Variety critic Peter Debruge dubbed it a "beautifully shot" yet "overstuffed social satire" with intelligent ideas poorly executed. Ian Freer of Empire stated that Amsterdam "fails to amount to more than the sum of its occasionally impressive parts." Leah Greenblatt, writing for Entertainment Weekly, rated Amsterdam a C+ and described it as an "odd shaggy-dog mystery" with a "hectic" story, but called the production and costume design "impeccable."

Some reviews were very critical. Rating the film two out of five stars, Robbie Collin of The Daily Telegraph found the dialogue unimpressive and wrote that Russell's screenplay "makes heavy weather" of the story. Describing the plot as a "wanton disarray", IndieWires David Ehrlich rated the film a C−, owing to its "negligible" entertainment value. Barry Hertz of The Globe and Mail wrote, "Amsterdam so badly wants to be a light romp with heavy-duty meaning that it cannot help but be flattened by a sagging self-exhaustion." Mark Kennedy of the Associated Press stated that the film "reaches for something contemporary to say about race relations, concentration of wealth, veterans and fascism but ends up with a plodding, mannerist noise." Giving the film an F rating, Chase Hutchinson of Collider criticized its "egregious" editing, "banal" dialogue, "muddled" tone, and overall "lack of vision."

See also
 Smedley Butler
 Bonus Army

References

External links
 
 
 
 
 
 Official screenplay

2022 comedy films
2022 thriller films
2020s American films
2020s Canadian films
2020s comedy mystery films
2020s comedy thriller films
2020s English-language films
2020s historical thriller films
2020s mystery thriller films
20th Century Studios films
American comedy mystery films
American comedy thriller films
American historical comedy films
American historical thriller films
American mystery thriller films
Canadian comedy mystery films
Canadian comedy thriller films
Canadian historical thriller films
Canadian mystery thriller films
English-language Canadian films
Film productions suspended due to the COVID-19 pandemic
Films about conspiracy theories
Films about friendship
Films about veterans
Films directed by David O. Russell
Films produced by Arnon Milchan
Films scored by Daniel Pemberton
Films set in 1918
Films set in 1919
Films set in 1921
Films set in 1933
Films set in Amsterdam
Films set in France
Films set in Manhattan
Films set in New Jersey
Films shot in Los Angeles
Great Depression films
IMAX films
Murder mystery films
Regency Enterprises films
Western Front (World War I) films